Stromberg is a former Verbandsgemeinde ("collective municipality") in the district of Bad Kreuznach, Rhineland-Palatinate, Germany. The seat of the Verbandsgemeinde was in Stromberg. On 1 January 2020 it was merged into the new Verbandsgemeinde Langenlonsheim-Stromberg.

The Verbandsgemeinde Stromberg consisted of the following Ortsgemeinden ("local municipalities"):

 Daxweiler
 Dörrebach
 Eckenroth
 Roth
 Schöneberg
 Schweppenhausen
 Seibersbach
 Stromberg
 Waldlaubersheim
 Warmsroth

References

Former Verbandsgemeinden in Rhineland-Palatinate